Rollin 30s Harlem Crips is a street gang formed by Belizean American Crips who had moved from South Los Angeles to Belize and then Harlem, New York.

History
In 1961, a hurricane prompted the first major wave of immigration from British Honduras to South Los Angeles, which was already home to street gangs like the Crips and the Bloods. The spread of gangs among Belizeans accelerated in the 1980s. Following a wave of gang violence, ethnic Belizean gang members were deported back to Belize. Deported Belizean gang members quickly spread the culture of Bloods and Crips in Belize City. While the gang was in Belize, it adopted its current name. By 1995, the gang was active in Harlem, New York City and responsible for several assaults and shootings. In 1997, the gang was making $4,000 per day in drug sales.

On May 12, 2021, the United States Attorney for the Central District of California announced the arrests of three members of the Rollin' 30s Crips, Malik Lamont Poweel, Khai McGhee, and Marquise Anthony Gardon, in the robbery of a $500,000 Richard Mille watch from a patron of Il Pastaio in Beverly Hills, California.

Activities
The Rollin 30s Harlem Crips are involved in drug trafficking. Other criminal activities of the gang include weapon trafficking, prostitution, murder, and robbery.

References

Organizations established in the 1960s
1960s establishments in California
Crips subgroups
Belizean-American culture
South Los Angeles
Gangs in New York City